Grönland Records  is a British–German independent record label founded in London, England, which relocated to Berlin in 2009. "Grönland" (German for Greenland) refers both to the country, the label's founder, Herbert Grönemeyer and the eponymous piece on his 1993 album Chaos.

Origin
The label was founded by German actor and singer Herbert Grönemeyer in connection with an eight-CD box set called Pop 2000.  The CD box set and its companion TV series were designed to document music culture in Germany over the course of the 20th century and featured artists such as Neu!, Faust, Kraftwerk, The Notwist, DAF, and Mouse on Mars.

Philosophy
Grönland's philosophy is that business decisions should be influenced not by marketing strategies, but by the musician and his craft.  Without sacrificing attention to the economic aspects of the label's survival, Grönland, with its small staff and optimal structure, is committed to providing an environment where art and music are free to grow, and to giving full support and attention to its musicians on a level rarely seen in larger record companies.  Consequently, Grönland only signs a maximum of six to eight bands and projects per year.

Artists on Grönland's roster
The list below consists of artists listed on the "Artists" and "Alumni" sections of Grönland's web site.

Current roster
 Boy
 Broadcast 2000
 Deutsch Amerikanische Freundschaft
 William Fitzsimmons
 Fujiya & Miyagi
 Gang of Four
 Nina Hagen
 Emily Haines
 Harmonia
 Harmonia & Brian Eno '76: Tracks and Traces (remastered reissue with bonus material)
 Harrisons
 Merz
 Metric
 Neu! (a major reissue project, the first official CD issues)
 Conny Plank
 Roedelius
 Christoph H. Müller & Roedelius (Mueller_Roedelius)
 Roedelius / Story (Lunz)
 Sol Seppy
 Susanne Sundfør
 Windmill

Former roster (selection)
 AK4711
 Bombay1
 Dextro
 Freeland (released on continental Europe in collaboration with Marine Parade)
 Half Cousin
 Kira
 Lockdown Project
 Machine
 Pet
 Petra Jean Phillipson
 Psapp (Grönland continues to market their album Tiger My Friend despite the band now being on Domino Records)
 Sondre Lerche
 The Earlies (released in continental Europe in collaboration with 679 Recordings)

References

External links
 Grönland's web site (in English and German)
 
 Grönland’s last.fm entry

IFPI members
Record labels established in 1999
Reissue record labels
British independent record labels
1999 establishments in England